Bandar bin Talal Al Rashid (1850–1869) was one of the rulers of the Emirate of Jabal Shammar. His reign was very brief, just for barely one year. He killed his uncle, Mutaib, to become the emir and was murdered by his other uncle, Muhammad, who ruled the Emirate until 1897.

Biography
Bandar was born in around 1850. He was the eldest son of the second emir Talal bin Abdullah and a grandson of the Abdullah bin Ali Al Rashid who founded the Emirate in 1836.

Bandar and his brother, Badr, murdered their uncle and the emir, Mutaib bin Abdullah, in Barzan Palace in 1869, and Bandar became the emir of Jabal Shammar. The reason for the killing of Mutaib was his maltreatment of them. Due to this incident an intrafamilial and succession crisis occurred, and the older senior members of the family including Bandar's uncle Muhammad bin Abdullah and his great uncle Ubayd left Hail for Riyadh. However, the exile of Muhammad had very undesired effects on the commercial activities since he was very competent in managing the caravan and Hajj related activities, and Bandar went to Riyadh and asked his uncle to return to Hail who accepted his offer and continued to assume his previous post. 

In 1869 Bandar was killed by his uncle, Muhammad bin Abdullah, because of the disputes. Then Muhammad bin Abdullah ruled the Emirate until 1897. Following this Bandar's brothers went into exile. However, there is another report suggesting that Muhammad bin Abdullah executed them and other members of the family following the murder of Bandar.

References

External links

19th-century monarchs in the Middle East
19th-century murdered monarchs
1850 births
1869 deaths
Arabs from the Ottoman Empire
House of Rashid
People from Ha'il
Politicians of the Ottoman Empire
Sons of monarchs